The .ac top-level domain is the Internet country code (ccTLD) for Saint Helena, Ascension and Tristan da Cunha, used primarily for Ascension Island (Saint Helena has its own ccTLD, .sh). It is administered by NIC.AC, a subsidiary of the Internet Computer Bureau based in the United Kingdom.

Registration for the domain is open to anyone. The registry accepts registrations of internationalized domain names.

The domain is marketed by some domain-brokers as a domain for the city of Aachen, Germany, after the automotive license plate designation ("AC") for the city.

Use as an abbreviation for "academic"
Due to its similarity to the .ac ("academic") second-level domain that exists under some country code top-level domains, some educational institutions also register under the .ac top-level domain:

 Royal Global University, Guwahati in Assam, India
 The University of Kurdistan - Hawler
 Ralston College in Savannah, Georgia, United States
 Faith Mission Bible College in Edinburgh, Scotland
 It is also used for promotion, campaigns, and URL shortening by various parts of the University of Edinburgh, Scotland
 Promotions and english courses by the University of Cambridge, Cambridge
 The Mahidol Oxford Tropical Medicine Research Unit (MORU) in Bangkok, Thailand
 INFORM (Information Network Focus on Religious Movements), based at the London School of Economics
 Newcastle University, an online university unconnected with Newcastle University in the United Kingdom or the University of Newcastle, Australia
 Dhaka International University in Dhaka, Bangladesh
 Community of Physics, an institution that works to advance physics education and research in Dhaka, Bangladesh

Other uses
 On 10 December 2013, The Pirate Bay switched to an .ac domain.
 .ac is being used by anti-cheat software Easy Anti-Cheat.
 .ac is occasionally used as an abbreviation for activities and/or accommodation by tourism websites.

See also
 .uk
 .sh
 .ac (second-level domain)

References

External links
 
 .AC Domain Name Registry

Ascension Island
Country code top-level domains
Council of European National Top Level Domain Registries members
Computer-related introductions in 1997

sv:Toppdomän#A